Elisha Hunt may refer to:
Elisha Hunt (steamboat pioneer) (1779–1873), principal founder of the company that built the historic steamboat Enterprise
Elisha Hunt Rhodes (1842–1917), soldier in the American Civil War
Elisha Hunt Allen (1804–1883), American lawyer, diplomat, and Hawaiian justice